Anushree (born 25 January 1988) is an Indian television presenter and actress who appears in Kannada films. She started her career as a television host in Kannada television and went on to become an actress, she was one of the highest paid anchor in south India. mostly appearing in Kannada language films. She won Karnataka State Film Awards. For Best Dubbing Artist for the film Murali Meets Meera.

Early life
Anushree was born into Tulu-speaking family of Sampath and Shashikala in Surathkal, Mangalore, Karnataka, India. She has a younger brother, Abhijeeth. Her parents separated when she was young with her father leaving "never to return or even stay in touch." She completed her schooling in St. Thomas Bangalore till Class V, before shifting to Narayana Guru School in Mangalore. She returned to Bangalore once she completed her pre-university education, when she began getting offers to host television shows.

Career

Anushree started her career in television as an anchor in a phone-in music show named Tele Anthyakshari on Namma TV a television channel based in Mangalore. She went on to become an anchor on ETV Kannada's television show Demandappo Demandu, which gained her popularity. She also participated in the reality show Bigg Boss Kannada 1. She completed 80 days in the Bigg boss home. Also hosted several stage shows such as Suvarna Film Awards, Filmfare Awards, TV9 Film Awards, Zee Music Awards, SIIMA Awards, Celebrity Cricket League and went on to feature in prominent shows like, Comedy Khiladigalu and Twenty-Twenty Comedy Cup, Kuniyona Baara and others.

She made her entry to filmdom with Benkipatna which won her the NAK Media Achievement Award for Best Debut Actress. She won the Karnataka State Film Award for Best Dubbing Artist for the film Murali Meets Meera in 2011. Anushree has played a lead role in the film Uppu Huli Khaara which was directed by Imran Sardhariya. Now she is one of the highest paid anchors in Kannada.

Filmography

Awards

 2011: Karnataka State Film Awards:Best Dubbing Artist (Female): Murali Meets Meera
 2015: Zee Kutumba Awards Popular Anchor
 2015: NAK Media Achievement Award - Best debut actress : Benkipatna
 2016: Zee Kutumba Awards 2016 - Best Anchor
 2017: Zee Kutumba Awards 2017 - Popular Anchor
 2018: Kempegowda Prashasti
 2018: Zee Kutumba Awards 2018 - Favourite Anchor
 2019: Zee Kutumba Awards 2019 - Favourite Anchor 
2020:Zee Kutumba Awards 2020 - Favorite Anchor
2021:Zee Kutumba Awards 2021 - Favorite Anchor
2022:Zee Kutumba Awards 2022 - Favorite Anchor

Television career

References

Indian women television presenters
Indian television presenters
Living people
Actresses in Kannada cinema
Actresses from Bangalore
Mangaloreans
Tulu people
Indian film actresses
Indian television actresses
Actresses in Kannada television
21st-century Indian actresses
Bigg Boss Kannada contestants
1988 births